Jordan James (born November 25, 1982) is a retired American soccer goalkeeper who played professionally in the USL First Division.

Youth
James played youth soccer with the Syracuse Blitz.  He then attended St. Lawrence University where he played on the men's NCAA Division III soccer team from 2001 to 2004.  He finished his collegiate career with 36 victories in 44 games.

Professional
In 2004, James spent the collegiate off season with the Albany Blackwatch Highlanders of the fourth division Premier Development League, earning a 0.82 goals against average in fifteen games.  In 2005, he signed with the Wilmington Hammerheads of the USL Second Division before moving to the Cincinnati Kings of the USL-2 in 2006.  James had an outstanding 2006 season, leading the league in saves and shutouts and was selected as first team All League.  This led to interest from Major League Soccer and trials with both the Columbus Crew and FC Dallas.  However, it was the Houston Dynamo which signed him for the 2007 season.  He made no first team appearances, playing twice with the Houston Reserves before being released at the end of the season.  On February 28, 2008, the Portland Timbers of the USL First Division signed Jordan.  He retired at the end of the season.

Coach
In 2005 and 2006, James served as the goalkeeper coach for the St. Lawrence University men's soccer team. While playing for the Cincinnati Kings of the USL Second Division, James served as an assistant and goal keeper coach for the University of Cincinnati Men's Soccer Program. When he signed with the Houston Dynamo, he then moved to San Jacinto College as that school's goalkeeper coach.

References

External links
 Portland Timbers profile

1982 births
Albany BWP Highlanders players
American soccer coaches
American soccer players
Cincinnati Kings players
Association football goalkeepers
Houston Dynamo FC players
Living people
Sportspeople from Syracuse, New York
Portland Timbers (2001–2010) players
Soccer players from New York (state)
USL League Two players
USL Second Division players
USL First Division players
Wilmington Hammerheads FC players
St. Lawrence Saints men's soccer players
St. Lawrence Saints men's soccer coaches